Pterotus is a genus of fireflies in the beetle family Lampyridae. There are at least two described species in Pterotus.

Species
These two species belong to the genus Pterotus:
 Pterotus curticornis Chemsak, 1978
 Pterotus obscuripennis LeConte, 1859

References

Further reading

 
 

Lampyridae
Articles created by Qbugbot